Třebíz is a municipality and village in Kladno District in the Central Bohemian Region of the Czech Republic. It has about 200 inhabitants.

Notable people
Václav Beneš Třebízský (1849–1884), writer

References

Villages in Kladno District